Elisabeth Augusta of Schleswig-Holstein (28 December 1623 – 9 August 1677) was the daughter of king Christian IV of Denmark and Kirsten Munk. She shared the title Countess of Schleswig-Holstein with her mother and siblings.

Biography
As her siblings, she was raised by her grandmother Ellen Marsvin and the royal governess Karen Sehested, but spent 1628-29 at the Swedish court. She was married to Hans Lindenov (d. 1659) in 1639, and became the mother of Sophie Amalie Lindenov. She was described as a vulgar, constantly indebted gambler. She did not side with her sister Leonora Christina Ulfeldt during the conflict between Leonora and the king and was not close to her siblings. She was granted a royal pension in 1664, and was also granted many gifts by king Christian V, but continued to be haunted by debts during her life.

Ancestry

References 
 Dansk biografisk Lexikon / IV. Bind. Clemens - Eynden(in Danish)

1623 births
1677 deaths
17th-century Danish nobility
17th-century Danish women
Lindenov family
Children of Christian IV of Denmark
Daughters of kings